Nicole Althea McClure (born 16 November 1989) is an American-born Jamaican footballer who plays as a goalkeeper for Northern Irish club Sion Swifts and the Jamaica women's national team.

Early life
McClure was born in Jamaica, Queens, on the state of New York, United States. Her parents hail from Jamaica, in the Caribbean.  She grew up playing in the Long Island Junior Soccer League (LIJSL) for the Auburndale Strikers from 1998 to 2003 and the East Meadow Shooting Stars from 2003 to ’07. With the Shooting Stars, she won the Eastern New York Youth Soccer Association (ENYYSA) Girls-Under-15 State Open Cup final in 2005. Nicole also played for Eastern New York's Olympic Development Program (ODP). (AuburndaleSoccerclub.org)

College career
McClure attended the University of Hawaii at Manoa and the University of South Florida.

Club career
During her college career, McClure played for Tampa Bay Hellenic. After that, she left the United States and played exclusively for clubs in Europe and Israel.

International career
McClure made her senior debut for Jamaica in 2009. She was a key player in the first ever Jamaican qualification to a FIFA Women's World Cup (the 2019 edition). Similar to Tim Krul for the Netherlands against Costa Rica in the 2014 FIFA Men's World Cup quarter finals, McClure was brought on by Hue Menzies as a 120th-minute substitute for the penalty shootout against Panama in the 2018 CONCACAF Women's Championship third place play-off. She saved two of the four penalties she faced as Jamaica won 4–2.

References

External links

1989 births
Living people
Citizens of Jamaica through descent
Jamaican women's footballers
Women's association football goalkeepers
FC Neunkirch players
Klepp IL players
ŽNK Split players
ŽNK Osijek players
Sion Swifts Ladies F.C. players
Ligat Nashim players
Women's Premiership (Northern Ireland) players
Jamaica women's international footballers
2019 FIFA Women's World Cup players
Jamaican expatriate women's footballers
Jamaican expatriate sportspeople in Iceland
Expatriate women's footballers in Iceland
Jamaican expatriate sportspeople in Switzerland
Expatriate women's footballers in Switzerland
Jamaican expatriate sportspeople in Sweden
Expatriate women's footballers in Sweden
Jamaican expatriate sportspeople in Norway
Expatriate women's footballers in Norway
Jamaican expatriate sportspeople in Israel
Expatriate women's footballers in Israel
Jamaican expatriate sportspeople in Croatia
Expatriate women's footballers in Croatia
Jamaican expatriate sportspeople in France
Expatriate women's footballers in France
Jamaican expatriate sportspeople in Northern Ireland
Expatriate women's association footballers in Northern Ireland
People from Jamaica, Queens
Sportspeople from Queens, New York
Soccer players from New York City
American women's soccer players
Hawaii Rainbow Wahine soccer players
South Florida Bulls women's soccer players
African-American women's soccer players
American sportspeople of Jamaican descent
American expatriate women's soccer players
American expatriate sportspeople in Iceland
American expatriate sportspeople in Switzerland
American expatriate sportspeople in Sweden
American expatriate sportspeople in Norway
American expatriate sportspeople in Israel
American expatriate sportspeople in Croatia
American expatriate sportspeople in France
American expatriate sportspeople in Northern Ireland
21st-century African-American sportspeople
21st-century African-American women
20th-century African-American people
20th-century African-American women
Sundsvalls DFF players
Elitettan players
Tampa Bay Hellenic players